Fawole John Oyeyemi (born 4 March 1985 in Ile-Ife, Osun State) is a Nigerian chess player. He won the Nigerian Chess championship in 2013 and has a FIDE (World Chess Federation) peak rating of 2214. He held the title of Nigeria National Chess Champion Junior and Open in 2003 and 2013 respectively. Fawole is a FIDE Certified Chess In Education Lecturer, FIDE Instructor, US National Master and US District Coach.

In 1998, he learned how to play chess and participated in his first chess tournament in 1999. In 2002, he won the Opens II category of the NBL Chess Championship in Lagos. The following year, he became the National Junior Chess Champion by winning the Agusto & Co under 20 Chess Championship.  Following his achievement in 2003, he started playing in the (Masters Category) highest level in Nigerian Chess.

Fawole is Nigeria's 11th Junior Chess Champion & Nigeria's 36th National Chess Champion.

He is an executive director of BruvsChess Educational Serves, a chess organization that teaches chess as a school program to school children and BruvsChess Media, a Chess News and information Platform.

Fawole is the Organizer, The John Fawole Chess awards #TheJohnFawoleChessAwards which started in 2016 to reward outstanding performances of chess players in Nigeria.

Fawole lives in the Federal Capital Territory (FCT), Abuja and has earned a bachelor's degree in Computer Science from the University of Abuja.<ref>

References

External links
 

1985 births
Living people
Nigerian chess players
Chess FIDE Masters
Yoruba sportspeople
People from Ife
University of Abuja alumni